Hrafnhildur is an officially approved Icelandic female given name. It is the younger version of Hrafnhildr. The name is derived from the Old Norse words for bird and battle. It has consistently been in the top 100 Icelandic names for the last 20 years

Given name

Arts and music
Hrafnhildur Hagalín, Icelandic playwright  
Hrafnhildur Arnardóttir (Shoplifter), Icelandic artists working mainly in human hair

Sports
Hrafnhildur Lúthersdóttir, Icelandic Olympic swimmer  
Hrafnhildur Skúladóttir, Former Icelandic handball player and coach  
Hrafnhildur Hanna Þrastardóttir, Icelandic handball player  
Hrafnhildur Hauksdóttir, Icelandic football player  
Hrafnhildur Guðmundsdóttir, Icelandic Olympic swimmer  
Katrín Davíðsdóttir, Icelandic CrossFit athlete

Science and Technology
Hrafnhildur Hanna Ragnarsdóttir, Professor Emeritus in Education and Development

References

External links
 Hrafnhildur on Nordic Names

Feminine given names
Icelandic feminine given names